The 1972 United States Senate election in Montana took place on November 7, 1972. Incumbent United States Senator Lee Metcalf, who was first elected to the Senate in 1960 and was re-elected in 1966, ran for re-election. After winning the Democratic primary, he moved on to the general election, where he faced Hank Hibbard, a State Senator and the Republican nominee. Following a close campaign, Metcalf managed to narrowly win re-election to his third term in the Senate over Hibbard.

Democratic primary

Candidates
Lee Metcalf, incumbent United States Senator
Jerome Peters

Results

Republican primary

Candidates
Hank Hibbard, State Senator
Harold E. Wallace, 1970 Republican nominee for the Senate
Norman C. Wheeler
Merrill K. Riddick

Results

General election

Results

See also 
 United States Senate elections, 1972

References

Montana
1972
1972 Montana elections